The First Year is a 1920 American comedic play written by Frank Craven, and produced by John Golden and directed by Winchell Smith on Broadway.  It was a hit on Broadway, running for 729 performances.

Background
The three-act play, which centers on the first year of married life, ran on Broadway at the Little Theatre for 729 performances from Wednesday, October 20, 1920 through June 17, 1922.(21 October 1922). The First Year Is Joyous, The New York Times  (Prior to opening on Broadway, a warm-up performance was put on at the Apollo Theater in Atlantic City, New Jersey on October 7, 1920.)

It was the biggest Broadway show of the season, and when it finally closed, it was the third-longest run in Broadway history to that time.  It received positive reviews upon its release.Mantle, Burns. The Best Plays of 1920-21, pp. 63-97 (1921)  Critic Alexander Woollcott even called it "one of the best, if not the best [comedy], ever written by an American."

After closing in New York, the company went on tour.

A London production was mounted in 1926-27, which opened at the Apollo Theatre on November 26, 1926, and moved to the Prince of Wales Theatre on March 27, 1927, with a total run of 180 performances.

The Equity Library Theatre staged a revival in New York in 1947.

Film adaptations
It was adapted to films of the same name in 1926 and 1932.

Original Broadway cast
 Roberta Arnold as Grace Livingston
 William Sampson as Mr. Livingston
 Maude Granger as Mrs. Livingston
 Tim Murphy as Dr. Anderson
 Lyster Chambers as Dick Loring
 Frank Craven as Thomas Tucker
 Leila Bennett as Hattie
 Hale Norcross as Mr. Barstow
 Merceita Esmonde as Mrs. Barstow

References

External links

 

1920 plays